Bruce Ellsworth Brubaker Jr. (born December 29, 1941) is an American former pitcher in Major League Baseball who appeared in two major league games, one for the Los Angeles Dodgers in  and one for the Milwaukee Brewers in  during a professional career that lasted for 14 years (1959–1972).

Biography
Brubaker's two MLB appearances came as a relief pitcher during lopsided losses, by his Dodgers to the St. Louis Cardinals (13–4) on April 15, 1967, and his Brewers to the Chicago White Sox (9–3) on August 5, 1970. In the former game, he allowed a three-run home run to Baseball Hall of Famer Lou Brock, and in the latter contest, he gave up a two-run blast to journeyman Syd O'Brien. Those five runs were all that he allowed in the majors in 3 innings pitched. He gave up five hits and one base on balls, with two strikeouts.

During his minor league career, Brubaker won 117 games.

Family
He currently resides in Owensboro, Kentucky where he owns a Ford/Lincoln/Mazda car dealership named Champion. In May 2010, the Brubaker family opened another Ford dealership in Rockport (REO) Indiana which has now consolidated with their Owensboro, Ky store in November 2018. In May 2011 they opened Championship 54 Autos in Owensboro. Brubaker has been married for over 42 years to Leda. Has two sons, Bruce Ellsworth "Duke" Brubaker III, and Tyler C. Brubaker, and four grandchildren. 

On May 14, 2010, Brubaker was inducted into the Pennsylvania Sports Hall of Fame. His father, Bruce Ellsworth "Hushpuppy" Brubaker Sr., is also a member of the Pennsylvania Sports Hall of Fame. Brubaker's nephew is Jorge Posada of the New York Yankees; Posada's mother is the sister of Brubaker's wife.

References

External links

1941 births
Living people
Austin Senators players
Baseball players from Harrisburg, Pennsylvania
Businesspeople from Kentucky
Cedar Rapids Braves players
Eau Claire Braves players
Evansville Triplets players
Los Angeles Dodgers players
Major League Baseball pitchers
McCook Braves players
Milwaukee Brewers players
People from Owensboro, Kentucky
Portland Beavers players
San Diego Padres (minor league) players
Spokane Indians players
Syracuse Chiefs players
Wellsville Braves players
Yakima Braves players